Sinwol-dong is a dong, neighbourhood of Yangcheon-gu in Seoul, South Korea.

History
During the Gabo reform during the 31st year of reign of  King Gojong, the administrative district was reorganized from Yangcheon-hyeon (縣) to Gun (郡), and when Sinwol was incorporated into Gimpo-gun in 1914, the administrative district changed to  Sindang-ri, Yangdong-myeon, Gimpo-gun. The name Sindang-ri derives from the name of the village of "Sinwol and Danggok." The Sindangri region   was a scanty mountainous village which had  villages such as "Danggok, Koeumwol, Shindae, Shinwol, Gatri".   "Danggok" was called Danggol because there was a city shrine (都堂) where they had shrine rituals. "Koeunwol" had a meaning of a town where the moon shines bright which originated from the korean word for beautiful moon.  "Shindae" means Newly founded village.

The words "Sinwol" and "Gateri" derive from the shape of the region, and are said to be the same shape  as the half-moon on the east side of Jeungsan (currently Sinwol 3-dong area).

See also 
Administrative divisions of South Korea

References

External links
Yangcheon-gu official website
 Sinwol 1-dong Resident office center

Neighbourhoods of Yangcheon District